This is a list of members of the Irish House of Commons between 2 July 1790 and 11 July 1797. There were 300 MPs at a time in this period.

References
 
 

790